Pianello (pronounced [u byɑ̃.ˈneː.lːu]) is a commune in the Haute-Corse department of France on the island of Corsica. The village is in the la Serra area, south east of  Castagniccia.

Population

See also
Communes of the Haute-Corse department

References

Communes of Haute-Corse